The Three Forks Group is a stratigraphical unit of Famennian age in the Williston Basin.

It takes the name from the city of Three Forks, Montana, and was first described in outcrop near the city by A.C. Peale in 1893 (for the Three Forks Shale).

Lithology
The Three Forks Group is composed of Dolomite, mudstone and bituminous shale.

Hydrocarbon production
In the subsurface of the Williston Basin, the Three Forks is referred to as the Three Forks Formation, which lies between the Birdbear Formation below, and the Bakken Formation above.

Oil produced from the Three Forks Formation in the Williston Basin of North Dakota and south-eastern Saskatchewan is often included in production statistics with the overlying Bakken Formation. For instance, the Three Forks and Bakken were combined in estimates of potential production released by the United States Geological Survey on April 30, 2013. The estimate by the USGS projects that 7.4 billion barrels of oil can be recovered from the Bakken and Three Forks formations and 6.7 trillion cubic feet of natural gas and 530 million barrels of natural gas liquids using current technology.

Distribution

Subdivisions

Relationship to other units

The Three Forks Group conformably overlies the Saskatchewan Group and is disconformably overlain by the Madison Group.

It is equivalent to the sum of the Wabamun Group and Exshaw Formation in Alberta.

References

Stratigraphy of Saskatchewan
Geologic groups of North Dakota
Geologic groups of Montana
Geologic groups of North America
Carboniferous southern paleotemperate deposits
Devonian southern paleotemperate deposits